Angry Orchard is a hard cider company located near Walden, New York, United States, owned by the Boston Beer Company. It makes hard cider using apples from its own 60-acre orchard located in Hudson Valley, New York. In its first year, the cider was only available in New England, Colorado, Maryland, and New York. In 2012, it was introduced nationwide (with its three flagship flavors, Crisp Apple, Traditional Dry, and Apple Ginger) and quickly captured 40% of the United States hard cider market, rising to 50% by 2014 and comprising 20% of the Boston Brewing Company's output.

History
In 2016, Angry Orchard teamed with treehouse builder Pete Nelson to create a treehouse tasting room on Animal Planet's Treehouse Masters. In March 2019, Angry Orchard launched their Cider+Food App, a first-of-its-kind augmented reality experience that brings cider and food pairings to life. Users of the app can scan their phones over Angry Orchard's bottles of their core styles—Crisp Apple, Rosé, Easy Apple and Pear, with the digital experience guided by head cidermaker Ryan Burk. In 2020, Angry Orchard was the top-selling cider brand in the United States, with sales of $222.4 million that year.

Controversy
On August 4, 2015, Angry Orchard had a voluntary recall of select cases of its hard cider due to concerns of refermentation in the bottles. This decision was made after consumer inquiries about bottles that were broken or overflowing when opened, as well as several follow-up quality tests.

References

External links

American ciders
Companies based in Orange County, New York